Murong Xuecun (born 1974) is the pen name of the Chinese writer Hao Qun (郝群). His debut work Leave Me Alone: A Novel of Chengdu, which was distributed online, propelled him to stardom. On July 22, 2008 Murong made the long list for the Man Asian Literary Prize. , his microblog account has nearly 1.1 million followers. 

Murong's writing deals mostly with social issues in contemporary China, exploring themes such as corruption, business-government relations, and general disillusionment over modern life. His literature is known for its nihilistic, realist, racy, and fatalist style. Following his rise to fame, Murong has emerged as one of the foremost critics of censorship in China.

Criticism of censorship
In 2009, Murong Xuecun wrote an exposé on a pyramid scheme in Jiangxi province. The work, China: In the Absence of a Remedy, was a first-hand account of Murong's personal experiences with the pyramid scheme network that lasted twenty-three days.  Murong Xuecun was awarded the 2010 People's Literature Prize for the work. 

In his acceptance speech for the Prize, Murong wrote a scathing commentary about his editor that he worked with for China: In the absence of a remedy. He also launched into a critique of the state of censorship in China in general. The speech was banned at the awards ceremony, but made its rounds across the internet. The draft of the speech was translated into English and delivered to the Hong Kong Foreign Correspondents’ Club in February 2011, followed by a publication by The New York Times in November 2011. In the draft, Murong alluded to a wide array of censorship restrictions, including limits on discussing current affairs, contemporary personalities, and being forced to change the phrase "Chinese people" to "some people" in parts of his work. More obscure restrictions were also discussed, such as scrubbing the use of "Henan people" because it carries the air of regional discrimination, and removing references to "India-flavoured farts" because the editor was concerned about a diplomatic rift between China and India. Murong wrote that "The only truth is that we cannot speak the truth . The only acceptable viewpoint is that we cannot express a viewpoint. We cannot criticise the system, we cannot discuss current affairs, we cannot even mention distant Ethiopia."

In his feature story in Norwegian newspaper Aftenposten in 2011, his criticism of Chinese authorities included claims that for detainees of China, there are a number of "odd ways of dying while under arrest" — at least one individual allegedly "died while playing hide-and-seek", and at least another allegedly "died while he was drinking water", and at least one allegedly "died while he was dreaming".

Publications  
Deadly Quiet City Stories From Wuhan, COVID Ground Zero

References

External links

 Murong Xuecun's blog
 Murong Xuecun's microblog
  An Excerpt from Leave Me Alone: A Novel of Chengdu
 Word Crimes: "Murong Xuecun is a novelist who writes about corruption in China. In the last year, he has emerged as one of the most outspoken critics of censorship." A New York Times video by Jonah M. Kessel,  November 2011

1974 births
Living people
Chinese bloggers
People's Republic of China essayists